Yours truly is a form of valediction, especially at the end of a written communication.

Yours truly may also refer to:

 Yours truly, a humorous alternative to the pronoun 'I' or 'me' – referring to oneself
 Yours Truly (band), an Australian pop-punk band formed in 2016
 Yours Truly (2018 film), an Indian romantic drama film
 Yours Truly (2019 film), a documentary about the Chinese artist and activist Ai Weiwei
 Yours Truly (Snow Crash), a character in the novel Snow Crash
 "Yours Truly" (song), by Blindspott

See also
 Yours Truly Theatre, Bangalore, a theatre group in India

Albums
 Yours Truly (Air Supply album), 2001
 Yours Truly (Ariana Grande album), 2013
 Yours Truly (Rick Braun album), 2005
 Yours Truly (Sick of It All album), 2000
 Yours Truly (Sublime with Rome album), 2011
 Yours Truly, a 1991 album by Earl Thomas Conley